A rout  is a panicked, disorderly and undisciplined retreat of troops from a battlefield, following a collapse in a given unit's command authority, unit cohesion and combat morale (esprit de corps).

History

Historically, lightly-equipped soldiers such as light cavalry, auxiliaries, partisans or militia were important when pursuing a fast-moving, defeated enemy force and could often keep up the pursuit into the following day, causing the routed army heavy casualties or total dissolution. The slower moving heavy forces could then either seize objectives or pursue at leisure. However, with the advent of armoured warfare and blitzkrieg style operations, an enemy army could be kept more or less in a routed or disorganized state for days or weeks on end. In modern times, a routed formation will often cause a complete breakdown in the entire front, enabling the organized foe to attain a quick and decisive victory in the campaign. In the blitzkrieg warfare that characterized World War II, the French Army was decisively defeated in the Battle of Sedan (1940) opening a  gap in Allied lines into which Heinz Guderian poured his mechanized forces. German tanks kept the rout going, and the Allies were unable to stabilize the situation before the Wehrmacht occupied Paris and forced the capitulation of the French government.

Tactics
Feigned routs may be used as a military deception to entice an enemy into pursuing the "retreating" force, with the intent of causing the enemy to abandon a strong defensive position or leading the enemy into an ambush. This carries some risk because a feigned rout can quickly turn into a real one.

It was a favourite tactic of the Vikings and it is thought that Norman cavalry successfully performed a feigned rout at the Battle of Hastings.

In the Battle of Cowpens, Daniel Morgan's planned retreat of the unreliable forward militia was interpreted by the British commander Banastre Tarleton as a rout, as intended.  In over-aggressively pressing the attack, the British lost cohesion and were overwhelmingly defeated in the resulting double envelopment by the Americans. This feigned rout tactic had several benefits: it was a ruse de guerre that played off British expectations that an undisciplined militia would rout on contact, creating British overconfidence; the militia screened the main American force from the British view; and by asking for only two volleys before the retreat Morgan set an achievable goal for shaky and poorly trained militia facing British regulars, as well as allowing the militia units to remain intact for later parts of the battle.

Leading up to the French decisive victory at the Battle of Austerlitz, Napoleon ordered his forces to retreat. Desperate to lure the Allies into battle, Napoleon gave every indication in the days preceding the engagement that the French army was on the brink of collapse, even abandoning the dominant Pratzen Heights near Austerlitz.

Other uses of the term

A "rout", or rout-party, was in Georgian England a relatively informal party given by the well off to which large numbers of people were invited. The term covered a variety of styles of event, but they tended to be basic, and a guest could not count on any music, food, drink, cards, and dancing being available though any of them might be. "Rout-cake" was a particular type, mentioned by Jane Austen in Emma.  Often, all there was to do was talk. James Gillray's caricature of 1796 shows Lady Georgiana Gordon (1781–1853, presumably "Lady Godina"), not yet Duchess of Bedford and indeed only about 16 at most, gambling at a game called Pope Joan, with the winning "Curse of Scotland" in her hand. At left is Albinia Hobart, Countess of Buckinghamshire, perhaps the hostess. She was famous for hosting gambling parties. Behind the card-tables is a tight crush of people.

The events sometimes became rather disorderly, and the name presumably originates as a metaphorical extension of the military term.

"Rout" is often used to mean "an overwhelming defeat" as well as "to put to disorderly retreat" or "to defeat utterly". It is often used in sports to describe a blowout.

In English common law, a rout is a disturbance of the public peace by three or more persons acting together in a manner that suggests an intention to riot although they do not carry out the inferred act. As a common law offence, it was abolished in England and Wales by the Public Order Act 1986.

Rout is personified as the eponymous deity in Homer's Iliad as the cowardly son of Ares.

"Rout" is also one of several collective nouns for a group of snails.

See also

 Crowd psychology

References

Military strategy
Military tactics